Muraena appendiculata is a moray eel found in the southeast Pacific Ocean around Chile. It was described by Alphone Guichenot in 1848, originally under the genus Muraenophis.

References

appendiculata
Taxa named by Alphonse Guichenot
Fish described in 1848
Fish of the Pacific Ocean
Endemic fauna of Chile